USS Churchill County (LST-583), originally USS LST-583, was an  built for the United States Navy during World War II and in commission from 1944 to 1946 and 1960 to 1968. Named for Churchill County, Nevada she was the only U.S. Navy vessel to bear the name.

Construction and commissioning
LST-583 was laid down on 18 May 1944 at Evansville, Indiana, by the Missouri Valley Bridge and Iron Company. She was launched on 5 July 1944, sponsored by Mrs. D. C. Hollis, and commissioned on 2 August 1944.

First period in commission, 1944-1946
During World War II, LST-583 was assigned to the Pacific Theater of Operations and participated in the Lingayen Gulf landing in January 1945, the Zambales-Subic Bay landing in January 1945, and the Mindanao Island landings in March and April 1945. Following the war, LST-583 performed occupation duty in the Far East until mid-December 1945.

LST-583 was decommissioned in March 1946. While out of commission, she was renamed USS Churchill County (LST-583) on 1 July 1955.

Second period in commission

Churchill County was recommissioned on 1 November 1960 and served in Amphibious Force, United States Atlantic Fleet, until she was again decommissioned in September 1968.

Disposal
Struck from the Naval Vessel Register on 15 September 1974, Churchill County was sold for scrapping by the Defense Reutilization and Marketing Service (DRMS) on 1 August 1975. However, she was acquired by Minerve Shipping and Trading Corporation, S.A., of Panama, renamed Petrola 131 c. 1976–1977, and placed in commercial service. Her final fate is unknown.

Awards and honors
LST-583 earned three battle stars for World War II service.

References

See also
 List of United States Navy LSTs

 

LST-542-class tank landing ships
World War II amphibious warfare vessels of the United States
Cold War amphibious warfare vessels of the United States
Churchill County, Nevada
Ships built in Evansville, Indiana
1944 ships